Martin Eugen Ekström (6 December 1887 – 28 December 1954) was a Swedish military adventurer who became the leader of the National Socialist Bloc, an umbrella organization for various fascist and National Socialist groups. Ekström was born in By, Avesta Municipality. During the 1918 Finnish Civil War, he led the Vasa Regiment which was responsible of the Vyborg massacre. Lieutenant colonel Ekström led the 3rd Battlegroup of the Swedish Volunteer Corps in the Finnish Winter War.  He died in Helsinki, aged 67.

Career
Ekström was born in By, Kopparberg County, the son of Anders Gustav Ekström and his wife Johanna Mathilda (née Eriksson). He graduated from the Artillery School in 1916 and completed the German officers examination in Turkey in 1916. Ekström was military Instructor of the Persian Gendarmerie from 1911 to 1915 and was chief of staff of Vaasa White Guard District. He participated in the Finnish Civil War, the Estonian War of Independence and the Lithuanian Wars of Independence.

Ekström was the leader of the National Socialist Bloc from 1934 and editor och Riksposten from 1934.
Known for events in the Vyborg massacre

Personal life
In 1920 he married Gladys Kurtén (born 1896), the daughter of Karl Henrik Kurtén  and Florence Emma Elliott.

References

Sources

Further reading

External links
 Ekström, Martin Eugen (06.12.1887), in Swedish with photo.
 
 Swedish Fascism - Why Bother? by Lena Berggren

1887 births
1954 deaths
People from Avesta Municipality
Swedish politicians
Swedish Army officers
Volunteers in the Winter War
Prussian Army personnel
Estonian military personnel
Finnish Army personnel
Recipients of the Iron Cross (1914), 2nd class
People of the Finnish Civil War (White side)
Iranian Gendarmerie personnel